Lake Pateros is a reservoir on the Columbia River in the U.S. state of Washington. It was created in 1967 with the construction of Wells Dam. The reservoir lies almost entirely in Douglas and Okanogan counties, although the dam itself lies partially in the easternmost portion of Chelan County. The reservoir stretches from there upstream to the Chief Joseph Dam. Towns on Lake Pateros include Pateros and Brewster, Washington.

Lake Pateros has been known by many variant names, including Butler Lake, Chief Long Jim Lake, Fort Okanogan Lake, Lake Azwell, and others.

See also
 List of dams in the Columbia River watershed

References

Lakes of Chelan County, Washington
Lakes of Douglas County, Washington
Reservoirs in Washington (state)
Lakes of Okanogan County, Washington
Protected areas of Okanogan County, Washington
Protected areas of Chelan County, Washington
Protected areas of Douglas County, Washington
1967 establishments in Washington (state)